She's Got Game is an American reality television dating game show starring rapper The Game. The series premiered on August 10, 2015, on VH1.

Contestants

Episodes

Sexual Battery Lawsuit
Contestant Priscilla Rainey sued Jayceon Taylor, AKA The Game, after an incident in May 2015 during the production of the show. Rainey alleged that during an off-camera date to a Chicago-area sports bar, Taylor repeatedly lifted her skirt and groped her buttocks, vagina, and breasts while the two of them were standing on a lighted stage area, exposing her to onlookers in the bar. Three days after the incident, Rainey confronted Taylor on the tour bus commissioned for the show while cameras filmed. In the video, which was shown as part of subsequent court hearings, one of the other contestants mentions Rainey had been on a date with Taylor, in violation of the competition's rules, and had returned to the cast hotel visibly upset. Rainey & Taylor then got into a heated argument, during which Taylor berated Rainey for speaking about the incident, then threatened to strangle Rainey if she did not exit the bus after Rainey described the events in explicit detail.

In August 2015, Rainey sued Taylor for sexual battery in a Chicago federal court. Taylor evaded being served with the lawsuit, with one process server making 41 attempts to deliver documents to his home in California. On February 1, 2016, the judge in the case entered a default judgment after Taylor failed to contact the court or enter a plea. Ten days later, Florida attorney Andrew Williams filed motions on Taylor's behalf to quash the service and vacate the default. The judge declined to quash but did set aside the default, scheduling trial for November 16. The judge also scheduled a mandatory settlement conference for June 16, which Taylor requested be rescheduled, claiming to fear for his safety due to Chicago's gun violence issue. The settlement conference was cancelled and never rescheduled. Taylor also filed a request for change of venue to Florida in July, and two motions for continuance in September & October, all of which were denied. Taylor made multiple posts about the case on social media, that included vulgar remarks directed toward Rainey.

Jury selection began on Monday, November 14 as scheduled. Taylor did not appear, with attorney Andrew Williams requesting a continuance and producing a note from an endodontist claiming Taylor required emergency care. The Judge called to confirm the story, and the endodontist stated that Taylor had called his emergency line around 6 p.m. Sunday evening. The plaintiff's attorney's responded by producing photos from Taylor's Snapchat account, showing him at an apparent nightclub, smoking an unknown substance at 2:44 a.m. that morning. The judge denied the continuance request, declaring his belief that Taylor had no intention of appearing in court. Taylor again failed to appear on Wednesday, November 16. Williams produced records of flight & hotel reservations as alleged proof of Taylor's intent to be in court, but the judge noted that the length of stay did not match the expected trial dates. The continuance motion was again denied, with the judge noting his belief that Taylor's alleged dental emergency was a "ruse." During the trial, Taylor never attended court. Taylor's defense attorney brought some witnesses via teleconference, but notably did not request permission to make Taylor available via the same method. The jury ultimately found in favor of Rainey, awarding $1.13 million in compensatory damages and $6 million in punitive damages.

Taylor appealed the ruling to the Seventh Circuit Court of Appeals in 2019, citing the judge's refusal to reschedule the trial, the missing-witness instructions given to the jury, and the allowance of the bus video over Taylor's objections. The court turned down the appeal, noting that the trial scheduling is at the discretion of the judge, the need for missing-witness instructions was due to Taylor's own decision to skip court, and that the bus video had clear probative value.

References

2010s American reality television series
2015 American television series debuts
2015 American television series endings
2010s American game shows
Television series based on singers and musicians
African-American reality television series
English-language television shows
VH1 original programming